Urfjelldokka Valley is a broad ice-filled valley between Urfjell Cliffs and Skappelnabben Spur along the Kirwan Escarpment in Queen Maud Land. Mapped by Norwegian cartographers from surveys and air photos by Norwegian-British-Swedish Antarctic Expedition (NBSAE) (1949–52) and additional air photos (1958–59). Named in association with Urfjell Cliffs.

Valleys of Queen Maud Land
Princess Martha Coast